George Hector Taylor (3 June 1900 – September 1982) was an English professional football outside right who played in the Football League for Brentford and Millwall.

Career 
An outside forward, Taylor joined hometown Third Division club Brentford for the club's debut season in the Football League in 1920–21. He broke into the team in November 1920 and took over the outside right position from George Smith. Taylor held onto his place until the end of the season, making 23 appearances, before being released. Taylor moved to Third Division South rivals Millwall in 1921 and later joined Clapton Orient, for whom he failed to make an appearance.

Career statistics

References

1900 births
English footballers
English Football League players
Brentford F.C. players
Millwall F.C. players
Footballers from Brentford
Leyton Orient F.C. players
1982 deaths
Association football outside forwards